Microbacterium petrolearium is a Gram-positive, rod-shaped and aerobic bacterium from the genus Microbacterium which has been isolated from oil-contaminated water from the Dagang Oilfield in China.

References

External links
Type strain of Microbacterium petrolearium at BacDive -  the Bacterial Diversity Metadatabase	

Bacteria described in 2014
petrolearium